Mörschied is an Ortsgemeinde – a municipality belonging to a Verbandsgemeinde, a kind of collective municipality – in the Birkenfeld district in Rhineland-Palatinate, Germany. It belongs to the Verbandsgemeinde Herrstein-Rhaunen, whose seat is in Herrstein.

Geography

Location
The municipality lies on the Naturpark Saar-Hunsrück. The municipal area is 64% wooded. To the east lies Herrstein. The nearest major town is Idar-Oberstein to the south.

Constituent communities
Also belonging to Mörschied are the outlying homesteads of Am Herrsteinerweg, Asbacherhütte, Hahnenmühle and Harfenmühle.

Politics

Municipal council
The council is made up of 12 council members, who were elected by majority vote at the municipal election held on 7 June 2009, and the honorary mayor as chairman.

Mayor
Mörschied’s mayor is Harald Friedrich.

Coat of arms
The municipality’s arms might be described thus: Per bend sinister sable issuant from the line of partition a demilion with tail bifurcated argent crowned Or and chequy gules and argent issuant from base a mount of three.

Culture and sightseeing

Buildings
The following are listed buildings or sites in Rhineland-Palatinate’s Directory of Cultural Monuments:
 Evangelical church, Äckerchen – aisleless church with ridge turret, 1731-1746; décor; organ, firm of G. Stumm, 1896; two tomb slabs
 Herrsteiner Straße 11 – stately timber-frame Quereinhaus (a combination residential and commercial house divided for these two purposes down the middle, perpendicularly to the street), partly solid, partly slated, half-hipped roof, 19th century
 Herrsteiner Straße 21 – Quereinhaus, partly timber-frame (plastered), timber-frame gallery, marked 1830, conversion 1860
 Hahnenmühle, southeast of the village on the Fischbach – stately miller’s and farmer’s house, marked 1907; mill gear from time of building, bakehouse, mountain cellar
 Schleiferei Biehl (gemcutting shop), northwest of the village on the Fischbach – latter half of the 19th century, technical equipment

Regular events
Since 1990, Mörschied has had an open-air stage on which the Karl-May-Festspiele Mörschied are staged in the summer months each year. In 2010, the play Winnetou gegen Santer (gegen means “against”; both those named in the title are characters from Karl May’s writings) was produced.

Economy and infrastructure

To the south runs Bundesstraße 422. Serving nearby Idar-Oberstein is a railway station that, as a Regional-Express and Regionalbahn stop, is linked by way of the Nahe Valley Railway (Bingen–Saarbrücken) to the Saarland and the Frankfurt Rhine Main Region. The Rhein-Nahe-Express running the Mainz-Saarbrücken route serves the station hourly. Every other train goes through to the main railway station in Frankfurt with a stop at Frankfurt Airport. Formerly, fast trains on the Frankfurt-Paris route had a stop at Idar-Oberstein.

References

External links
Mörschied in the collective municipality’s webpages 

Birkenfeld (district)